The Access Yea Community Education Program (AYCE) is an innovative high school educational program in  Victoria, Australia that is designed to help school leavers and other students who do not fit into the regular school system.

The program
Established in 1999, this is a statewide program that operates from eight centres across Victoria. It is managed by Yea High School, Yea, under the direction of program manager Annette Scales, but operates completely separate from the school. The program is state government-funded.

Each student is given an individual program. Some might combine Victorian Certificate of Education (VCE) work with Technical and Further Education courses, or year 10 subjects with VCE subjects. The key is flexibility. It is also seen as an alternative to home schooling. Parents and students are required to sign a contract with the school stipulating the obligations of each party.

Recognition
The program was cited as an example of best practice in open learning programs in a research report, prepared for the Department of Education, Employment and Workplace Relations, in February 2001.

On 12 October 2004 Ben Hardman praised the program in the Victorian Legislative Assembly. He had visited AYCE with Lynne Kosky, Minister for Education, on 8 October.

See also
 Vistas High School Program

References

External links
 

Education in Victoria (Australia)
Australian educational programs
Educational institutions established in 1999
1999 establishments in Australia